The 1915–16 NCAA men's basketball season began in December 1915, progressed through the regular season, and concluded in March 1916.

Season headlines 

 The Pacific Coast Conference began play with four original members, three of which fielded basketball teams for the 1915–16 season.
 Utah won the post-season Amateur Athletic Union (AAU) national championship tournament— in which a mix of collegiate and non-collegiate amateur teams competed — in 1916 to become the first of only four collegiate teams to win the tournament. No college team would win the tournament again until 1920.
 In February 1943, the Helms Athletic Foundation retroactively selected Wisconsin as its national champion for the 1915–16 season.
 In 1995, the Premo-Porretta Power Poll retroactively selected Wisconsin as its national champion for the 1915–16 season.

Conference membership changes

NOTE: Although Oregon joined the Pacific Coast Conference in 1915, it did not field a basketball team during the 1915–16 season.

Regular season

Conference winners

Statistical leaders

Awards

Helms College Basketball All-Americans 

The practice of selecting a Consensus All-American Team did not begin until the 1928–29 season. The Helms Athletic Foundation later retroactively selected a list of All-Americans for the 1915–16 season.

Major player of the year awards 

 Helms Player of the Year: George Levis, Wisconsin (retroactive selection in 1944)

References